"A Little Party Never Killed Nobody (All We Got)" is a 2013 song recorded by Fergie, Q-Tip and GoonRock for the soundtrack to the 2013 film The Great Gatsby, an adaptation of F. Scott Fitzgerald's novel of the same name, released through Interscope Records on May 17, 2013.

Background and composition
On April 4, 2013, Interscope and Warner Bros. announced the track listing for the Music from Baz Luhrmann's Film The Great Gatsby, which included a brand new track titled "A Little Party Never Killed Nobody (All We Got)" performed by Fergie with Q-Tip and GoonRock. Prior to the release of the album, the song premiered on Rolling Stones official website on April 15, 2013.

"A Little Party Never Killed Nobody (All We Got)" is a swing-flavored hip hop and electro house song with lyrics about partying.

Music video
The official music video was released via YouTube on August 6, 2013.

Track listing
 Digital download
 "A Little Party Never Killed Nobody (All We Got)" (Drop City Yacht Club Remix) – 4:26

 Digital download (remixes)
 "A Little Party Never Killed Nobody (All We Got)" (Paige Festival Remix) – 6:04
 "A Little Party Never Killed Nobody (All We Got)" (Connor Cruise + Chebacca Remix) – 3:50
 "A Little Party Never Killed Nobody (All We Got)" (Marco Da Silva Remix) – 4:00
 "A Little Party Never Killed Nobody (All We Got)" (Audiobot Remix) – 3:13
 "A Little Party Never Killed Nobody (All We Got)" (Drop City Yacht Club Gangster Summer Remix) – 4:26

Charts and certifications

Weekly charts

Year-end charts

Certifications

Release history

References

2013 songs
Fergie (singer) songs
GoonRock songs
Electro swing songs
The Great Gatsby
Q-Tip (musician) songs
Songs written by Fergie (singer)
Songs written by Andrea Martin (musician)
2013 singles
Songs written by Q-Tip (musician)
Music videos directed by Philip Andelman
Number-one singles in Russia
Interscope Records singles